Alophosoma hypoxantha is a moth of the family Noctuidae first described by Oswald Bertram Lower in 1902. It is found in Australia.

The wingspan is about 30 mm.

References

Catocalinae
Moths of Australia